Niels Thomasius Neergaard (27 June 1854 – 2 September 1936) was a Danish historian and political figure, a member of the Liberal Moderate Venstre and since 1910 of Venstre. He served as Council President of Denmark between 1908 and 1909 and as Prime Minister of Denmark and Finance Minister from 1920 to 1924. He was also minister of defence from 1908 to 1909, and finance minister on three more occasions: August to October 1909, 1910 to 1913 and 1926 to 1929.

Biography
Neergaard was educated at the University of Copenhagen, from which he attained the degrees cand.mag. in history and cand.polit. in 1879 and 1881, respectively.

Neergaard's greatest challenges as a politician were as prime minister and finance minister after the Easter Crisis of 1920, organizing the return of South Jutland to Danish rule and having to deal with the economic crisis brought on by World War I. He also had a significant influence on the content of the Constitution of 1915.

Neergaard's largest work as a historian, Under junigrundloven (1892-1916), is still considered the primary work on Danish politics 1848–1866. In addition to his political activities and work as a historian he also dealt with journalism, and in 1884 he founded a cultural and literary magazine, Tilskueren.

References

External links
Danish Wikipedia on Niels Neergaard

1854 births
1936 deaths
Danish Defence Ministers
Danish Finance Ministers
19th-century Danish historians
20th-century Danish historians
Danish journalists
Prime Ministers of Denmark
Members of the Folketing
20th-century Danish politicians
Danish magazine founders